Sheikh Mohammad-Hadi Abdekhodaei , (born 28 July 1938) is an Iranian Ayatollah He is currently a member of the Fifth term of the Assembly of Experts. He was previously the 11th Ambassador of Iran to the Vatican, and also served in the Iranian Parliament for 3 terms.

Biography 

Mohammad-Hadi Abdekhodaei was born on July 28, 1938 in Mashhad, Iran. He was born into a religious family, as his father Gholam Hossein Tabrizi was a well known Ayatollah. He attained Ijtihad in Qom Hawza, afterwards he obtained his doctorate from University of Tehran in Philosophy. After the 1979 Iranian revolution, he was elected by the people of Razavi Khorasan to represent them in the Iranian Parliament. He was elected 3 separate times, the first term, second term, and the fourth term. He was also chosen to be the Ambassador of Iran to the Holy See, where he was awarded the Order of Merit and Virtue by Pope John Paul II. He is also fluent in Farsi, Arabic, English and Italian. Currently he serves as the representative of the people of Razavi Khorasan in the Assembly of Experts. He has held that role since the 2016 Iranian Assembly of Experts election.

Works 

 Foruq Haq in Nahj al-Balagha
 Political Piety in Nahj al-Balagha

See also 

 List of Ayatollahs
 List of members in the Fifth Term of the Council of Experts
 Hadi Khosroshahi

References 

1938 births
Living people
People from Mashhad
Iranian politicians
Iranian ayatollahs
Members of the Assembly of Experts